Achillea millefolium, commonly known as yarrow or common yarrow, is a flowering plant in the family Asteraceae. Other common names include old man's pepper, devil's nettle, sanguinary, milfoil, soldier's woundwort, and thousand seal.

The plant is native to temperate regions of the Northern Hemisphere in Asia, Europe, and North America. It has been introduced as a feed for livestock in New Zealand and Australia.

Description

Achillea millefolium is an erect, herbaceous, perennial plant that produces one to several stems  in height, and has a spreading rhizomatous growth form. Leaves are evenly distributed along the stem, with the leaves near the middle and bottom of the stem being the largest. The leaves have varying degrees of hairiness (pubescence). The leaves are cauline, and more or less clasping, being more petiolate near the base.

The inflorescence has 4 to 9 phyllaries and contains ray and disk flowers which are white to pink, blooming from March to October. The tiny disk flowers range from 10 to 40. The inflorescence is produced in a flat-topped capitulum cluster and the inflorescences are visited by many insects, featuring a generalized pollination system. The small achene-like fruits are called cypsela.

The plant has a sweet scent similar to that of chrysanthemums, so powerful that it may be irritating to some.

Chemistry 
The dark blue essential oil of yarrow contains chemicals called proazulenes.

Chamazulene and δ-Cadinol are chemical compounds found in A. millefolium. The chromophore of azulene was discovered in yarrow and wormwood and named in 1863 by Septimus Piesse.

Yarrow contains isovaleric acid, salicylic acid, asparagine, sterols, and flavonoids. It also contains phenolic acids such as gallic acid, 3, 4-dihydroxy benzoic acid, 2-OH-Benzoic acid, chlorogenic acid, vanillic acid, caffeic acid, syringic acid, p-coumaric acid, sinapic acid, ferulic acid, cinnamic acid and flavonoid such as myricetin, hesperidin, quercetin, luteolin, kaempferol, apigenin, rutin, hyperoside.

Taxonomy
The several varieties and subspecies include:
Achillea millefolium subsp. millefolium
A. m. subsp. m. var. millefolium – Europe, Asia
A. m. subsp. m. var. borealis – Arctic regions
A. m. subsp. m. var. rubra – Southern Appalachians
A. millefolium subsp. chitralensis – western Himalaya
A. millefolium subsp. sudetica – Alps, Carpathians
Achillea millefolium var. alpicola – Western United States, Alaska
Achillea millefolium var. californica – California, Pacific Northwest
Achillea millefolium var. occidentalis – North America
Achillea millefolium var. pacifica – west coast of North America, Alaska
Achillea millefolium var. puberula – endemic to California

Etymology 
The genus name Achillea is derived from mythical Greek character Achilles, who reportedly carried it with his army to treat battle wounds. The specific epithet millefolium as well as the common names milfoil and thousand leaf come from the featherlike leaves which are minutely divided.

The English name yarrow comes from its Saxon (Old English) name gearwe, which is related to both the Dutch word gerw (alternately yerw) and the Old High German word garawa. In the eastern counties it may be called yarroway. In France, it was called 'herbe de St. Joseph' after a Christian revision of the Achilles story, in which Jesus uses the plant to heal his adoptive father. It has also been called 'carpenter's weed' in this regard.

Other names include arrowroot, nose bleed, death flower, eerie, hundred leaved grass, knyghten, old man's mustard, sanguinary, seven-year's love, snake's grass, soldier, and gordaldo.

In New Mexico and southern Colorado, it is called plumajillo (Spanish for 'little feather') from its leaf shape and texture.

Distribution and habitat

Common yarrow is frequently found in the mildly disturbed soil of grasslands and open forests. Active growth occurs in the spring.

The plant is native to Eurasia and is found widely from the UK to China.

In North America, both native and introduced genotypes, and both diploid and polyploid plants are found. It is found in every habitat throughout California except the Colorado and Mojave Deserts.

It has been introduced as a feed for livestock in New Zealand and Australia, where it is a common weed of both wet and dry areas, such as roadsides, meadows, fields and coastal places.

Ecology

Birds 
Several cavity-nesting birds, including the common starling, use yarrow to line their nests. Experiments conducted on the tree swallow, which does not use yarrow, suggest that adding yarrow to nests inhibits the growth of parasites.

Insects 

Achillea millefolium is a food source for many species of insects.

 Moths
The larvae of the moths Bucculatrix clavenae, B. cristatella, B. fatigatella, B. humiliella, B. latviaella, Cnephasia abrasana, Cochylimorpha elongana, Coleophora argentula, C. carelica, C. ditella, C. expressella, C. follicularis, C. gardesanella, C. millefolii, C. partitella, C. ptarmicia, C. quadristraminella, C. succursella, C. vibicigerella, Depressaria olerella, D. silesiaca, Dichrorampha alpinana (broad-blotch drill), D. petiverella, D. vancouverana (tanacetum root moth), Eupithecia millefoliata (yarrow pug), E. nanata (narrow-winged pug), Gillmeria pallidactyla, Idaea pallidata, Isidiella nickerlii, Loxostege manualis, Phycitodes maritima, P. saxicola, Pyncostola bohemiella, Sophronia sicariellus and Thetidia smaragdaria (Essex emerald) feed on Achillea millefolium in Europe.
The larvae of Chlorochlamys chloroleucaria (blackberry looper), Coleophora quadruplex and Sparganothoides lentiginosana (lentiginos moth) feed on A. millefolium in North America.
Other species of moths with a more cosmopolitan distribution include Aethes smeathmanniana (Smeathmann's aethes moth), Chloroclystis v-ata (v-pug), Choristoneura diversana, Cochylidia richteriana, Epiblema graphana, Eupithecia succenturiata (bordered pug), E. vulgata (common pug), Jordanita budensis and Thiodia citrana (lemon bell).
The Noctuid Agrotis stigmosa has also been reared on A. millefolium.

 Beetles
Cassida denticollis, Galeruca tanaceti, Hypocassida subferruginea and Phytoecia virgula are cosmopolitan species of beetles that feed on A. millefolium.
Chrysanthia viridissima is a European species whose adults can be found feeding on pollen and nectar.
Trichodes ornatus (ornate checkered beetle) is a species found in North America whose adults can be found feeding on A. millefolium.

 True bugs
Horistus orientalis is a species of plant bugs that feeds on A. millefolium.

 Wasps
Hedychrum rutilans is a species of cuckoo wasps whose adults can be found feeding on A. millefolium in Europe and North Africa.

Cultivation 

Achillea millefolium is cultivated as an ornamental plant by many plant nurseries. It is planted in gardens and natural landscaping settings of diverse climates and styles. They include native plant, drought-tolerant, and wildlife gardens. The plant is a frequent component of butterfly gardens. The plant prefers well-drained soil in full sun, but can be grown in less ideal conditions.

Propagation 
It can become invasive.

Cultivars 
The species use in traditional gardens has generally been superseded by cultivars with specific 'improved' qualities. Some are used as drought-tolerant lawn replacements, with periodic mowing. The many different ornamental cultivars include: 'Paprika', 'Cerise Queen', 'Red Beauty', 'Red Velvet', 'Saucy Seduction', 'Strawberry Seduction' (red), 'Island Pink' (pink), 'Calistoga' (white), and 'Sonoma Coast' (white). The following are recipients of the Royal Horticultural Society's Award of Garden Merit:
 'Credo' 
 'Lachsschönheit' (Galaxy Series) 
 'Martina' 
'Lansdorferglut' 
The many hybrids of this species designated Achillea × taygetea are useful garden subjects, including: 'Appleblossom', 'Fanal', 'Hoffnung', and 'Moonshine'.

Toxicity 

Yarrow can cause allergic skin rashes. It reportedly can induce menstruation and cause miscarriages.

According to the American Society for the Prevention of Cruelty to Animals, yarrow is toxic to dogs, cats, and horses, causing increased urination, vomiting, diarrhea and dermatitis.
When consumed by cows, an unfavorable flavor is given to their milk. In a standard rodent model for reproductive toxicity, aqueous extracts of yarrow produced a significant increase in the percentage of abnormal sperm.

Uses

Traditional medicine 

A. millefolium was used in traditional medicine, in part due to its astringent properties and the mild laxative effect of its leaves. Yarrow and its North American varieties were traditionally used by many Native American nations. The Navajo historically considered it a "life medicine" and chewed the plant for toothaches and used its infusions for earaches. The Miwok in California used the plant as an analgesic and head cold remedy. Native American nations used the plant for healing cuts and abrasions, relief from earaches and throat infections, as well as for an eyewash. Common yarrow was used by Plains indigenous peoples to reduce pain or fever and aid sleep.

In the early 20th century, some Ojibwe people used a decoction of yarrow leaves on hot stones and inhaled it to treat headaches, or applied decoctions of the root onto skin for its stimulating effect.

Food 
The entire plant is reportedly edible and nutritious, but it is advised not to consume much. The foliage is pungent; both its leaves and flowers are bitter and astringent. The leaves can be eaten young; raw, they can be added to salad. The leaves, with an aniseed-grass flavour, can be brewed as tea.

In the Middle Ages, yarrow was part of a herbal mixture known as gruit used in the flavoring of beer prior to the use of hops. The flowers and leaves are used in making some liquors and bitters.

Other uses 
Yarrow is considered an especially useful companion plant, attracting beneficial insects and repelling some pests. It attracts predatory wasps, which drink the nectar and then use insect pests as food for their larvae. Similarly, it attracts ladybirds and hoverflies.

A. millefolium can be planted to combat soil erosion due to the plant's resistance to drought. Before the arrival of monocultures of ryegrass, both grass and pasture contained A. millefolium at a density of about 0.3 kg/ha. One factor for its use in grass mixtures was its deep roots, with leaves rich in minerals, minimizing mineral deficiencies in ruminant feed. It was introduced into New Zealand as a drought-tolerant pasture.

Some pick-up sticks are made of yarrow.

Yarrow can be used for dying wool as it contains apigenin and luteolin. Depending on the mordant the color may be green to yellow.

Culture 
In antiquity, the plant was known as herba militaris for its use in stanching the flow of blood from wounds. Other names implying its historical use in healing—particularly in the military—include bloodwort, knight's milfoil, staunchweed, and, from its use in the United States Civil War, soldier's woundwort. Its use in either starting or stopping nosebleeds led to the common name nosebleed. For its association with the Abrahamic devil it was called bad man's plaything, devil's nettle, and devil's plaything. It was called old man's pepper due to its pungent flavor, while the name field hop came from its use in beer making in Sweden.

Greece 
In the Classical Greek epic Iliad, Homer tells of the centaur Chiron, who conveyed herbal secrets to his human pupils and taught Achilles to use yarrow on the battlegrounds of Troy.

China 

Yarrow and tortoiseshell are considered to be lucky in Chinese tradition.

The stalks are dried and used as a randomising agent in I Ching divination.

Ireland and Great Britain 
In the Hebrides a leaf held against the eyes was sometimes believed to give second sight.

In Sussex and Devonshire superstition, yarrow was used for finding one's real sweetheart. One would pluck yarrow growing on a young man's grave while reciting:
Yarrow, sweet yarrow, the first that I have found,in the name of Jesus Christ, I pluck it from the ground;As Joseph loved sweet Mary, and took her for his dear,so in a dream this night, I hope, my true love will appear.
and go to sleep with the yarrow under the pillow.

In a similar tradition in Wicklow, girls would pick yarrow on Hallow Eve and recite:
Thou pretty herb of Venus' tree,Thy true name is yarrow;Now who my bosom friend may be,Pray tell thou me to-morrow.
then retire for the night without speaking and go to sleep with an ounce of yarrow sewn in flannel under the pillow.

In Suffolk a leaf was placed in the nose so it would bleed, while reciting
Green 'arrow, green 'arrow, you bears a white blow,If my love love me, my nose will bleed now;If my love don't love me, it 'on't bleed a drop,If my love do love me, 'twill bleed every drop.

In Dublin on May Day or the night before, women would place a stocking full of yarrow under their pillow and recite:
Good morrow, good yarrow, good morrow to thee,I hope by the yarrow my lover to see;And that he may be married to me.The colour of his hair and the clothes he does wear,And if he be for me may his face be turned to me,And if he be not, dark and surely may he be,And his back be turned toward me.

In the witchcraft trial of Elspeth Reoch in March 1616, she was alleged to have plucked "melefour," thought to be another name for yarrow, and said "In nomine Patris, Fiili, et Spiritus Sancti" to become able to cure distemper (disorders of the four humours) and impart the faculty of prediction.

Yarrow was thought to bring luck due to being, according to one woman cited by James Britten, "the first herb our Saviour put in His hand when a child." This is apparently a corruption of the Achilles myth.

Gallery

References

External links

Kansas Wildflowers – Achillea millefolium
Dr. Duke's Databases: Achillea millefolium
Winter identification photographs
Achillea millefolium L. Medicinal Plant Images Database (School of Chinese Medicine, Hong Kong Baptist University)  

millefolium
Butterfly food plants
Drought-tolerant plants
Flora of North America
Flora of Europe
Flora of temperate Asia
Garden plants of Europe
Garden plants of North America
Groundcovers
Herbs
Medicinal plants of Asia
Medicinal plants of Europe
Plants described in 1753
Plants used in traditional Native American medicine
Taxa named by Carl Linnaeus